Darrell Power (born June 3, 1968) is a Canadian musician, singer, songwriter, music producer, and former member of Canadian folk rock band Great Big Sea (1993–2003). He is a guest host of VOCM Nightline and Open Line. Power currently works as a substitute teacher. He lives in downtown St. John's, Newfoundland.

Education 
Power grew up in Outer Cove and attended Gonzaga High School. He later attended Memorial University of Newfoundland, where he met the other members of Great Big Sea. All the members of the group were pursuing English degrees at the time.

A devoted lifelong learner, Power was named Memorial University's 1999 Alumni of the Year, along with his bandmates.

Musical career

Great Big Sea 

Great Big Sea played its first official gig on March 11, 1993, opening for the Irish Descendants at Memorial University of Newfoundland in St. John's, Newfoundland. The founding band members included Doyle (vocals, guitar, bouzouki, mandolin), Séan McCann (vocals, bodhrán, guitar, tin whistle), Power (vocals, bass, guitar, bones), and Bob Hallett (vocals, fiddle, accordion, mandolin, concertina, bouzouki, whistles, bagpipes). The formation and growth of the band has been written about extensively by Doyle in his memoirs Where I Belong and A Newfoundlander in Canada.

After the release of their initial self-titled album Great Big Sea, the band was signed by Warner Music Canada to record their second album Up, which went 4× Platinum. Their next effort, Play, went 3× Platinum. Turn and Sea of No Cares also went Platinum on the Warner label. Sea of No Cares achieved number one status on Canadian charts. The Great Big DVD and CD, recorded live in Ottawa, went 3× Platinum. Subsequent efforts went Gold, as did the twentieth-anniversary greatest hits collection XX and the live concert CD Road Rage. The band toured nearly constantly for the band's first several years, sometimes traveling as many as 300 days a year, including tours in the United States and Europe.

Power retired from Great Big Sea in 2003 to spend more time with his family. He has since made guest appearances with the 7 Deadly Sons at the Newfoundland and Labrador Folk Festival and with Great Big Sea at Torbay 250.

Producer 
Power wrote and produced the theme songs for the successful provincial political campaigns of Premiers Williams, Dunderdale, and Ball. He also produced the album Tarahan's Town for the Newfoundland folk group Tarahan.

Festival of Friends 
In August 2010 he appeared at the Festival of Friends Song Writer Circle in Outer Cove where he performed his own original songs. The video of the performances achieved a following on YouTube.

Solo Performing 
In January 2018, Power launched a series of solo performances at the small Black Sheep pub in downtown St. John's. The performances were largely original music that had been written by Power. He described it as a combination of Canadiana, Americana, and Great Big Sea music.

Film 
Power produced and directed the film Where There is Love.

He was the subject of the 2022 documentary The Power of Music - Darrell's Story produced by his son Ben Power. The documentary focuses on his life during and after Great Big Sea, and his plans for the future.

Politics
On September 4, 2017, Power announced he was running for Councillor at Large in the City of St. John's. He ran on a platform of reduced taxes, improved efficiencies at city hall, and development of cultural industries. He received endorsements from former bandmates Alan Doyle, Sean McCann, and Bob Hallett. He was also endorsed by comedians Mark Critch and Pete Soucy. Power received 9992 votes or 7.65% of the votes, making him 8th in a field of 12 candidates. This was not enough for Power to be elected to the At Large position, as the top four candidates are elected to seats on council.

Philanthropy 
Power served as Master of Ceremonies for a Refugee Immigrant Advisory Council event. He has been a songwriter volunteer for Art Smart Songwriting. In December 2017 he was one of the judges for Sing NL, organized by former Canadian Idol judge Zack Werner.

References

External links
 https://twitter.com/DarrellPowerNL
 https://www.instagram.com/darrellpowernl/

Canadian folk guitarists
Canadian male guitarists
Living people
Memorial University of Newfoundland alumni
1968 births
Great Big Sea members
Canadian folk rock musicians
Musicians from St. John's, Newfoundland and Labrador
20th-century Canadian bass guitarists
21st-century Canadian bass guitarists
20th-century Canadian guitarists
21st-century Canadian guitarists
20th-century Canadian male singers
21st-century Canadian male singers
Male bass guitarists
People from Newfoundland (island)
Musicians from Newfoundland and Labrador